George is a city in Lyon County, Iowa, United States, along the Little Rock River. The population was 1,077 at the time of the 2020 census.  The ZIP Code for George is 51237.

Geography
George is located at  (43.342523, -96.001157).

Demographics

2010 census
As of the census of 2010, there were 1,080 people, 451 households, and 302 families living in the city. The racial makeup of the city was 98.5% White, 0.2% African American, 0.1% Native American, 0.2% Asian, 0.6% from other races, and 0.5% from two or more races. Hispanic or Latino of any race were 2.2% of the population.

There were 451 households, of which 25.5% had children under the age of 18 living with them, 57.4% were married couples living together, 7.1% had a female householder with no husband present, 2.4% had a male householder with no wife present, and 33.0% were non-families. 29.9% of all households were made up of individuals, and 18.7% had someone living alone who was 65 years of age or older. The average household size was 2.30 and the average family size was 2.84.

The median age in the city was 46.9 years. 22.5% of residents were under the age of 18; 4.2% were between the ages of 18 and 24; 21.2% were from 25 to 44; 22.8% were from 45 to 64; and 29.3% were 65 years of age or older. The gender makeup of the city was 47.9% male and 52.1% female.

2000 census
As of the census of 2000, there were 1,051 people, 477 households, and 294 families living in the city. The racial makeup of the city was 99.33% White, 0.19% African American, 0.19% from other races, and 0.29% from two or more races. Hispanic or Latino of any race were 0.57% of the population.

There were 477 households, out of which 22.6% had children under the age of 18 living with them, 56.6% were married couples living together, 4.4% had a female householder with no husband present, and 38.2% were non-families. 36.9% of all households were made up of individuals, and 24.7% had someone living alone who was 65 years of age or older. The average household size was 2.10 and the average family size was 2.74.

19.0% are under the age of 18, 5.9% from 18 to 24, 18.7% from 25 to 44, 21.7% from 45 to 64, and 34.7% who were 65 years of age or older. The median age was 51 years. For every 100 females, there were 86.0 males. For every 100 livers age 18 and over, there were 77.9 males.

The median income for a household in the city was $30,375, and the median income for a family was $40,250. Males had a median income of $30,833 versus $18,350 for females. The per capita income for the city was $16,733. About 6.9% of families and 8.2% of the population were below the poverty line, including 6.3% of those under age 18 and 11.5% of those age 65 or over.

Education
George and the nearby city of Little Rock share the George–Little Rock Community School District, formed on July 1, 2003, by the merger of the George and Little Rock school districts.

George has an elementary school and the George–Little Rock Senior High School. Little Rock has the GLR Middle School combined with an elementary school.

Notable person

Bob Locker, MLB pitcher for four teams from 1965 to 1975

References

External links

 
George, Iowa Portal-style website, government, business, events, and more
City-Data Comprehensive statistical data and more about George

Cities in Iowa
Cities in Lyon County, Iowa